Andreea Esca (born August 29, 1972) is a Romanian television journalist on the Pro TV network.

She graduated from a journalism school in 1990. She studied at CNN. She has been working as a news presenter at the Romanian television channel PRO TV for 24 years, since its beginning.
In 2002, she won the National Audiovisual Council prize for "Woman of the Year". She has been married since 2000 to businessman Alexandre Douglas Eram. They have two children.
Since 2006 she is the editorial director of "The One" magazine. Andreea is also a member of the "CNN World Report" team. In 2014 she released an autobiography titled "Ce-am făcut când am tăcut" [What I did while I was quiet] (in Romanian).

Biography 
Andreea Esca was born on August 29, 1972 in Bucharest, Romania. Her parents were Dumitru & Lucia Esca. Esca studied at the Superior School of Journalism (Școala Superioară de Jurnalism) and later moved on professionally to the Center of Independent Journalism in Prague, CNN Atlanta (USA), and also Athens, Greece.

Andreea Esca is primarily associated with ProTV, a Romanian news network. She began her career with ProTV on December 1, 1995 by announcing the introduction for the beginning of the channel's programming. Esca began her career at SOTI at the beginning of the 1990s. She constantly presented the 19:00 ProTV news hour, from the very beginning of ProTV and had some disruptions for maternity and vacations.

Esca has remained in the same channel for many years. In journalism, she debuted in January 1992 when one of her friends went for an interview to become a presenter at SOTI. In the interview, Esca went well, and was offered the job of a TV anchor. Although she trained in CNN for a time, she later returned in the country. In September 2018, she was given the French insignia of a Knight in the National Order of Merit by the French ambassador in Romania, Michèle Ramis.

References

Living people
1972 births
Television people from Bucharest